Stilpnia is a genus of Neotropical birds in the tanager family Thraupidae.

Many of these tanagers have a contrasting cap or hood and most have green or gold  and throats.

Taxonomy and species list
These species were formerly placed in the genus Tangara. A molecular phylogenetic study published in 2014 found that Tangara was polyphyletic. In the rearrangement to create monophyletic genera, the genus, Stilpnia, was erected with the black-headed tanager as the type species. The genus name is from the Ancient Greek στιλπνή/stilpni meaning "glittering" or "glistening".

The genus contains 14 species:
 Black-headed tanager, Stilpnia cyanoptera
 Silver-backed tanager, Stilpnia viridicollis
 Sira tanager, Stilpnia phillipsi
 Straw-backed tanager, Stilpnia argyrofenges
 Black-capped tanager, Stilpnia heinei
 Golden-hooded tanager, Stilpnia larvata
 Blue-necked tanager, Stilpnia cyanicollis
 Masked tanager, Stilpnia nigrocincta
 Black-backed tanager, Stilpnia peruviana
 Chestnut-backed tanager, Stilpnia preciosa
 Green-capped tanager, Stilpnia meyerdeschauenseei
 Scrub tanager, Stilpnia vitriolina
 Burnished-buff tanager, Stilpnia cayana
 Lesser Antillean tanager, Stilpnia cucullata

References

 
Bird genera
Taxa named by Kevin J. Burns (ornithologist)
Taxa named by Philip Unitt
Taxa named by Nicholas A. Mason